White Dawns is a collection of poems by the famous Macedonian writer Kočo Racin (Кочо Рацин), published in 1939 in Samobor, near Zagreb, Kingdom of Yugoslavia (present-day Croatia). This is the third collection of poems published in contemporary Macedonian language, after Venko Markovski's Folk Sorrows (Народни бигори) and The Fire (Огинот), published in 1938.

White Dawns was printed on 25 November at the printing house of Dragutin Schpuler in 4.000 copies. After the established communist practice, the title is printed in red. Since there lay a danger in discovering the author's identity, Kosta Solev published the work under the pseudonym "K. Racin" (К. Рацин). The poems of the book were prohibited by the Yugoslav government. Per Preply, it is the most translated book from North Macedonia.

White Dawns comprises 12 poems in the following order:

Days (Денови)
Sorrow (Печал)
Rural toil (Селска мака)
The tobacco harvesters (Тутуноберачите)
Lenka (Ленка)
Farewell (Проштавање)
A ballad to the unknown one (Балада за непознатиот)
Elegies for you (Елегии за тебе)
The morning above us (Утрото над нас)
Tatunčo (Татунчо)
To have a shop in Struga (На Струга дуќан да имам)
The diggers (Копачите)

See also
Socialist realism
Macedonian literature

References

External links
Several songs from White Dawns in Macedonian and in English
„Lenka“ performed by Zafir Hadžimanov (mp3)
White Dawns in Macedonian

Macedonian literature
Socialist realism